This was the 2012 season of the Long Island Lizards, a Major League Lacrosse team in Long Island, New York.

Regular season 

New York Lizards seasons
Long Island
2012 in lacrosse